Cassamba is a town and commune of Angola, located in the province of Moxico.

During the Angolan War of Independence, Luzia Inglês Van-Dúnem was the head of a communications centre there, which was controlled by the MPLA.

See also 

 Communes of Angola

References 

Populated places in Moxico Province